Jeremiah St. Juste (born 19 October 1996) is a Dutch professional footballer who plays as a centre-back for Primeira Liga club Sporting CP.

Early life
St. Juste was born in Groningen to a Dutch mother and a Kittian father. He grew up with three siblings. His brother Benjamin is a former Heerenveen and Groningen youth player, and has played futsal for VV Pelikaan. His other brother Yoshua plays futsal for the Netherlands national futsal team. His sister Naomi works as a fashion model and television actress in the Netherlands.

Club career

Early career
St. Juste started his career for SV Marum. In summer 2007 he joined to Jong Heerenveen. He made his Eredivisie debut on 24 January 2015 against Vitesse. He replaced Joost van Aken in injury time in a 4–1 home win.

Feyenoord
St. Juste moved to Feyenoord on 18 July 2017 on a four-year deal. He made his debut for that club on 9 September 2017 in a match against Heracles Almelo.

Mainz 05
On 7 August 2019, Feyenoord announced on their website St. Juste was moving to Mainz on a four-year contract for an undisclosed fee.

Sporting CP 
On 11 May 2022, it was confirmed that St. Juste would sign for Portuguese club Sporting CP at the beginning of the 2022–23 season. The deal was worth a reported €9.5 million.

International career
St. Juste was called up for the Netherlands U21 national team for qualifiers for the 2017 UEFA European Under-21 Championship in Poland. He is also eligible to play for the Saint Kitts and Nevis national team at senior level.

St. Juste was called up to the senior Netherlands squad in March 2021.

Career statistics

Honours
Feyenoord
 KNVB Cup: 2017–18
Johan Cruijff Shield: 2017, 2018

References

External links
 
 
 

1996 births
Living people
Footballers from Groningen (city)
Dutch footballers
Netherlands youth international footballers
Netherlands under-21 international footballers
Dutch people of Saint Kitts and Nevis descent
Association football defenders
Eredivisie players
Bundesliga players
Primeira Liga players
SC Heerenveen players
Feyenoord players
1. FSV Mainz 05 players
Sporting CP footballers
Dutch expatriate footballers
Expatriate footballers in Germany
Dutch expatriate sportspeople in Germany
Expatriate footballers in Portugal
Dutch expatriate sportspeople in Portugal